Eat Pray Thug is the debut studio album by American hip hop artist Heems. It was released on Megaforce Records on March 10, 2015. Music videos were created for "Sometimes", "Damn, Girl", and "Pop Song (Games)".

Critical reception

At Metacritic, which assigns a weighted average score out of 100 to reviews from mainstream critics, Eat Pray Thug received an average score of 76, based on 12 reviews, indicating "generally favorable reviews".

Colin Fitzgerald of PopMatters gave the album 7 stars out of 10, saying: "The beats on Eat Pray Thug are as wacky and irreverent as they were on Das Racist's mixtapes and their lone studio album Relax, but Heems is 180 degrees more serious on his own." Max Mertens of Exclaim! called it "the soundtrack of a son of immigrant parents learning that while you might be able to return home, nothing will be the same as how you left it."

Jayson Greene of Pitchfork said: "A handful of songs draw directly on his experiences as an Indian-American in a post–9/11 world, and they are sharply observed, painful, emotional, and deeply quotable." Zach Schonfeld of The A.V. Club gave the album a grade of B, describing it as "an unfailingly direct set of meditations on post-9/11 racism and failed love, set to skeletal beats and bracing, plainspoken hooks." Writing in Cuepoint, Robert Christgau gave the record an "A" and said "this is rapping that foregrounds the variegations of the ordinary speaking voice--its cracks, its rumbles, its anxious highs, its distracted lows, its deep-seated imperfections and insecurities. It's very American."

Accolades

Track listing

Charts

References

External links
 

2015 debut albums
Heems albums
Megaforce Records albums
Albums produced by Harry Fraud
Albums produced by Dev Hynes